Marcelo Luis Ebrard Casaubón (born 10 October 1959) is a Mexican politician who is serving as the Secretary of Foreign Affairs of Mexico. Affiliated with the National Regeneration Movement (MORENA) since 2018, he was appointed to lead the foreign ministry by Mexican President Andrés Manuel López Obrador on 1 December 2018. He has previously served as president of the United Nations Global Network on Safer Cities. He was the successful candidate of the Democratic Revolution Party-led electoral alliance to serve as Head of Government of the Federal District in the 2006 Federal District election, a position he held until 2012. He also served as secretary-general of the former Mexican Federal District Department, minister of public security, and minister of social development of the Mexican capital. In 2010, Ebrard was nominated as the "world's best mayor" by the Project World Mayor. From 2009 to 2012, he was the chair of the World Mayors Council on Climate Change.

Personal life and education
A descendant of the French emigrant wave from Barcelonette in 1915, Ebrard is the son of architect Marcelo Ebrard Maure and Marcela Casaubón. He received a bachelor's degree in international relations from El Colegio de México. He specialized in public administration and planning at France's École nationale d'administration. He was married to Francesca Ramos Morgan and had two daughters and one son: Francesca, Anne Dominique, and Marcelo Ebrard Ramos. He later divorced and married Mexican soap-opera actress Mariagna Pratts. In April 2011, Marcelo Ebrard announced his divorce from Pratts through an official press release. On 7 October 2011, Ebrard married for the third time to Rosalinda Bueso, the former Honduran ambassador to Mexico.

Political career
Ebrard became a member of the Institutional Revolutionary Party (PRI) in 1978. After volunteering in the presidential campaigns of 1976 and 1982, serving as an advisor to the secretary-general in 1988, and being elected to the Chamber of Deputies, he left the PRI with Manuel Camacho Solís in 1995 to found the now-extinct Party of the Democratic Center (PCD). In 2000 he briefly campaigned for the 2000 Head of Government election for the PCD before stepping down in March 2000 and throwing his support behind Andrés Manuel López Obrador as the candidate of the multi-party Alliance for Mexico City.

Following the election, he joined López Obrador's cabinet as secretary of public security in 2000. He became a member of the Party of the Democratic Revolution on 12 September 2004. On 8 July 2006, the French newspaper Le Monde ran an article indicating that Ebrard was an emerging leader of the Mexican Left. Manuel Camacho Solís, for whom Ebrard is a political protégé, has a reputation for running articles in foreign newspapers to indicate his political intentions. Many have seen this as an attempt to dismiss López Obrador and now rely on Ebrard to win the presidency in the 2012 presidential elections. On 7 December 2010, he was awarded the World Mayor prize in recognition of his environmental and civil-rights initiatives within the Federal District.

Head of Government of the Federal District (2006–2012)

Ebrard ran as the PRD's candidate for Head of Government in the Federal District election held on 2 July 2006, winning 47% of the votes.

He continued and expanded programs that Manuel López Obrador had initiated. A new initiative was the Prepa Sí program, granting low-income students scholarships. This reduced the school-dropout rate in the city to 6% and raised the grade point average from 7.2 to 8.2.

He expanded pensions for the elderly so that it was a right of every inhabitant of Mexico City who had reached 68 years of age, sending an initiative to the Legislative Assembly of the Federal District to elevate it to the status of law.

Among his actions having the greatest impact according to public opinion was the expropriation of properties and buildings that functioned as operational centers of crime. This included a property in the Tepito neighborhood, supposedly a drug-trafficking center; a large area of the Iztapalapa delegation, involved in the sale of stolen car parts, and two more drug sales properties in Santa María la Ribera. Although some in the business sector criticized these actions as an attack on private property — actions that received the support of the federal government — the initiative to seize ownership of these properties, as well as the introduction of video surveillance cameras, together with social development, helped reduce the crime index by 11% in Mexico City compared to 2006. He also created a special intelligence unit to fight against money laundering.

Ebrard made significant changes to the Historic Center, returning it to the citizens of Mexico City and its visitors by relocating the street vendors beginning in  mid-2007. The press classified his action as one of his government's successes since informal traders had significantly increased their numbers in recent years. Some people criticized the decision of one of its dependencies to demolish historic buildings in the city's first square to enable the relocation of street vendors. However, it was supported by the National Institute of Anthropology and History. He also rehabilitated the Monument to the Revolution and the Alameda.

In the area of health, he built hospitals in Tláhuac, Iztapalapa, and Tlalpan and promoted the development of medical specialties that did not exist in Mexico City's public health system.

During his mandate, he was recognized for his actions in the fight against climate change, the construction of mobility infrastructure, the transformation of public transport with the EcoBici (bike sharing) system; the expansion by 350% of the Metrobús system and the construction of Metro Line 12.

In 2009 he was named president of the World Mayors Council on Climate Change, and in 2010 he received the World Mayor award from the City Mayors Foundation.

Ebrard has stated that one of his goals is reviving the Nahuatl language. His plan calls for city workers to learn the language as an initial effort at reviving the language.

Marcelo Ebrard was the first head of government of the Federal District to complete his six-year term as governor, which began on 5 December 2006 and ended on 5 December 2012.

Controversy

The city's chief of police, Ebrard, and Federal Secretary of Public Safety, Ramón Huerta, were accused of not organizing a timely rescue effort when three undercover federal police officers were lynched by a mob in one of the capital's most impoverished suburbs in Tláhuac on 23 November 2004. After a thorough investigation, López Obrador gave Ebrard a vote of confidence, despite a request from President Fox that Obrador relieve him of his duties. Later, using his constitutional powers, Fox fired Ebrard in what critics believe was a politically motivated move to derail his political future. Ramón Huerta was also implicated in the incident, yet Fox gave Huerta his full support, and did not remove him from office. For this incident, Ebrard is under investigation, as are the federal authorities who also failed to act. He was later reinstated as Secretary of Social Development by López Obrador.

2012 Presidential election

On 30 March 2010, Ebrard publicly announced his intention to contest his party's candidacy for the Presidency of Mexico in 2012. As a pre-campaign platform, he founded his Progressive Vanguard movement. On 11 June 2011, the PRD movement of Jesús Ortega "Nueva Izquierda", also known as "Los Chuchos," named him the party's candidate for the Presidency of Mexico. In contrast, the current National Democratic Left, led by Dolores Padierna Luna, ruled in favor of Andrés Manuel López Obrador. On 15 November 2011, it was announced that the method to select a candidate for the presidency in 2012 would be a series of polls, which made Andrés Manuel López Obrador a winner. Ebrard refused to compete for the candidacy in 2012. As a formal Presidential candidate, Andrés Manuel López Obrador proposed that Ebrard would be made Secretary of the Interior if he won the presidential elections but Enrique Peña Nieto was elected president of Mexico.

President of Global Network of Safer Cities
In September 2012, Ebrard was elected to serve as president of the United Nations Global Network on Safer Cities which is part of the Urban Initiatives through the United Nations. He renounced his position on 3 February 2014, in order to contend for the Presidency of the PRD.

Secretary of Foreign Affairs

Ebrard was part of López Obrador's 2018 campaign team, responsible for interaction in Mexico's northwestern states. After López Obrador won the election on 1 July 2018, he was announced as the Secretary of Foreign Affairs a couple of days later, replacing Héctor Vasconcelos, who would instead become a Senator. During the resignation of former-Bolivian President Evo Morales and his government in November 2019, Ebrard viewed the situation as a coup and offered political asylum to Morales.

References

Further reading
 Diccionario biográfico del gobierno mexicano (1992), Ed. Fondo de Cultura Económica, Mexico

External links
 Marcelo Ebrard's Official Website
CityMayors profile
 Marcelo Ebrard at esmas.com
 Le Monde Article on Le Monde proclaiming Ebrard as the new leader of the Mexican Left
Wedding and Divorce Article on El Universal on how Manuel Camacho will dismiss López Obrador in favor of Marcelo Ebrard.
Article on El Universal on Ebrard's wedding registry
 Recibe el PRD capitalino pruebas de la afiliación de Marcelo Ebrard ("The Federal District PRD chapter received Marcelo Ebrard's proof of membership"), article on La Jornada
Marcelo Ebrard

1959 births
Living people
Mexican people of French descent
Politicians from Mexico City
École nationale d'administration alumni
Members of the Chamber of Deputies (Mexico)
Party of the Democratic Revolution politicians
Heads of Government of Mexico City
Institutional Revolutionary Party politicians
Grand Officers of the Order of Orange-Nassau
Mexican social democrats
Mexican Secretaries of Foreign Affairs
Morena (political party) politicians
Cabinet of Andrés Manuel López Obrador
20th-century Mexican politicians
21st-century Mexican politicians